The Finnish Institute in France, Institut finlandais, is an independent and multidisciplinary platform between Finland and France. The institute was opened in 1990 at 60 Rue des Écoles, in Quartier Latin in the 5th arrondissement in Paris. The institute is open to everyone and the entry is free.

Presentation of The Finnish Institute in France

The building

The building of the institute represents the Haussman architecture and dates back to 1862. Designed by a Finnish architect Juhani Pallasmaa. The facilities of the institute are located in a former movie theatre, Cinéma Cluny-Écoles, which closed in 1985. Institut finlandais is an international meeting place and platform presenting the Finnish culture, know-how and society. The premises were renewed during a major renovation in 2017–2018, led by architect Pekka Littow’s Littow architectes, and opened again to the public in July 2018. Studio Joanna Laajisto designed the interior decorations.

The Institute's facilities are owned by the Finnish government and host a multi-purpose hall with 195 seats, a 60-seat cinema, and a seminar room. The Finnish Institute's Café Maa, located in the main hall of the building, is a hub for discussions, launches, and professional meetings. The café is run by head chef and manager Alexandra Marschan-Claude, who offers a menu featuring a mix of traditional and modern Finnish and Nordic cuisine, as well as specialty coffees. The café's furniture is crafted by Made by Choice, a Finnish company that specializes in solid wood. Additionally, the Institute's gallery hosts a diverse range of exhibitions that showcase Finnish art and design. The auditorium offers regular film programs and other activities.

Management

The current director of Institut finlandais is Johanna Råman who started as the director in August 2018.

Former directors of Institut finlandais include:

 Meena Kaunisto 
 Marja Sakari 
 Marjatta Levanto 
 Iiris Schwank
 Kimmo Pasanen
 Tarmo Kunnas (the first director of the institute)

Missions and operations 
In collaboration with different international institutions, academia and creatives, Institut finlandais engages actively with critical discourse through onsite and off-site programming. Through their activities, Institut finlandais seeks to explore how a cultural framework can foster international conversations in creative fields, such as design, fashion, architecture, cinema and performing arts.

The core activities of the Institut finlandais are funded by the Finnish Ministry of Education and Culture. The projects of the Institut are also financed by different private foundations and organizations.

See also 

 Finland

References

External links 

 The website of Institut finlandais

Finland–France relations
1990 establishments in France
Buildings and structures in the 5th arrondissement of Paris
Tourist attractions in Paris
Cultural centers